Atwell Sidwell Mopeli-Paulus (born 1913) was a Lesotho author. He lived most of his life in South Africa, and wrote both in Sesotho and in English.

He is most known for his novels Ho tsamaea ke ho bona (To Travel Is to Learn, 1945), which among other things deals with his time as a soldier in World War II, Blanket Boy's Moon (1953) and Turn to the Dark (1956).

His death is often referred to as having occurred in 1960, probably because publishers have sought to obtain the copyright to his works. He was still alive and living in QwaQwa in the mid-1990s.

The first complete edition of his memoir, from childhood to the Witzieshoek revolt, The World and the Cattle, was published in 2008.

References 

Lesotho novelists
Lesotho male writers
South African male novelists
South African Sotho people
University of the Witwatersrand alumni
1913 births
1960 deaths
20th-century South African novelists
20th-century South African male writers
Sotho-language writers
Lesotho expatriates in South Africa